The Neipi Beach is a beach in Su'ao Township, Yilan County, Taiwan facing the Pacific Ocean.

Geology
The beach is located at the southern end of the Northeast and Yilan Coast National Scenic Area. It is a place for marine deposit with both fine sands and rubble. It also has marine abrasion land forms such as sea cape, sea cliff and reef at the bottom of the sea. The seabed around this area is uneven which resulted in the usual undercurrent under the sea. The beach is located at the south of Nanfang'ao Fishing Port and separated by a large pile of dirt.

Transportation
The beach is accessible south east from Su'ao Station of Taiwan Railways.

Pictures

See also
 List of tourist attractions in Taiwan

References

Beaches of Taiwan
Landforms of Yilan County, Taiwan